Sorolopha sphaerocopa is a moth of the family Tortricidae. It is found in India, Thailand, Japan, China, Sumatra, western Java, the Moluccas and Vietnam.

The wingspan is 15–16 mm for males and 16–17 mm for females. The forewings are pale bluish grey, sometimes with a pale green tinge. The hindwings are pale with a grey marginal half which is suffused with bronze fuscous.

References

External links
Japanese Moths

Moths described in 1931
Olethreutini
Moths of Asia